Edward Hunter Davies  (born 7 January 1936) is a British author, journalist and broadcaster. His books include the only authorised biography of the Beatles.

Early life
Davies was born in Johnstone, Renfrewshire, to Scottish parents. For four years his family lived in Dumfries until Davies was aged 11. Davies has quoted his boyhood hero as being football centre-forward, Billy Houliston, of Davies' then local team, Queen of the South.

His family moved to Carlisle in northern England when Davies was 11 and he attended the Creighton School in the city. Davies lived in Carlisle until he moved to study at university. During this time his father, who was a former Royal Air Force pay clerk, developed multiple sclerosis and had to retire on medical grounds from a civil service career.

Davies joined the sixth form at Carlisle Grammar School and was awarded a place at University College, Durham to read for an honours degree in History, but after his first year he switched to a general arts course. He gained his first writing experience as a student, contributing to the university newspaper, Palatinate, where one of his fellow student journalists was the future fashion writer Colin McDowell. After completing his degree course he stayed on at Durham for another year to gain a teaching diploma and avoid National Service.

Writing career
After he left university, Davies worked as a journalist, and in 1965 he wrote the novel Here We Go Round the Mulberry Bush, which was made into a film of the same name in 1967. He raised the idea of a biography of the Beatles with Paul McCartney when he met him to discuss the possibility of providing the theme song for the film. McCartney liked the idea of the book because inaccurate information had been published about the group but he advised him to obtain the approval of Brian Epstein. Epstein agreed to the proposal and the resulting authorised biography, The Beatles, was published in 1968. John Lennon mentioned in his 1970 Rolling Stone interview that he considered the book "bullshit", though Lennon at the time was vigorously debunking the Beatles' myth and anyone who had helped to create it.

In 1972, Davies wrote a book about football, The Glory Game, a behind-the-scenes portrait of Tottenham Hotspur. Davies also wrote a  column about his daily life in Punch called "Father's Day", presenting himself as a harried paterfamilias. In 1974, he was sent by The Sunday Times to look at a comprehensive school in action. He wrote three articles and then stayed on at the school – Creighton School in Muswell Hill, north London, now part of Fortismere School – to watch and study through a year in its life. The result was a book, the Creighton Report, published in 1976.

Davies has also written a biography of the fell walker Alfred Wainwright, and many works about the topography and history of the Lake District.

In children's literature, he has written the Ossie, Flossie Teacake and Snotty Bumstead series of novels.

As a ghostwriter, he has worked on the autobiographies of footballers Wayne Rooney, Paul Gascoigne and Dwight Yorke. The Rooney biography led to a successful libel action in 2008 by David Moyes, the manager of his former club, Everton. He has also ghostwritten politician John Prescott's 2008 autobiography, Prezza, My Story: Pulling no Punches.

He writes a football column for the New Statesman. A compilation of these articles was released as a book, The Fan, in 2005 by Pomona Press. Davies writes "Confessions of a Collector" in The Guardian's Weekend colour magazine. He has written a book about his collections with the same title.

During the Beatles sessions for the Let It Be album , the Beatles recorded a song called "There You Go Eddie" about Hunter Davies that appears on bootlegs. It was not officially released.

Davies was appointed Officer of the Order of the British Empire (OBE) in the 2014 Birthday Honours for services to literature.

Football fan
Davies has stated that the first football team he supported was Queen of the South, when he lived in Dumfries. After moving to Carlisle aged 11, he adopted English Football League club Carlisle United.

A long-term resident of London, Davies' third adopted team is Tottenham Hotspur. In international football, Davies supports Scotland.

Personal life
Davies was married to the writer Margaret Forster from 1960 until her death in 2016. Their daughter Caitlin Davies is also an author. From 1963, the family lived in the north London district of Dartmouth Park.

During the summer months they lived in their second home near Loweswater in the Lake District. It was sold in July 2016. His autobiography The Beatles, Football and Me was published in 2007.

Selected works
Here We Go Round the Mulberry Bush, 1st edition (1965), Little, Brown & Co. ISBN B00005XFOZ.
The Beatles: The Authorised Biography, 1st edition (1968), Heinemann.
 A Walk Along the Wall (1976), Quartet Books. .
The Creighton Report: A Year in the Life of a Comprehensive School (1976), Hamish Hamilton. .
The Beatles, Revised Edition (1978), McGraw-Hill. .
The Beatles, 2nd Revised Edition (1986), McGraw-Hill. .
Wainwright: The Biography (1995), Michael Joseph Ltd. .
A Walk Round The Lakes (2000), Orion. .
The Quarrymen (2001), Omnibus. .
Confessions of a Collector (2009), Quercus. .
The Beatles Lyrics (2014), Little, Brown & Co. .
A Life in the Day (2017), Simon & Schuster. .

References

External links
Journalisted – Articles by Hunter Davies

1936 births
Living people
Alumni of University College, Durham
British biographers
British male journalists
Male biographers
New Statesman people
Officers of the Order of the British Empire
People educated at Carlisle Grammar School
People from Carlisle, Cumbria
People from Johnstone
Scottish biographers
Scottish journalists
Ghostwriters